DNL, dnl, or similar, may refer to:

 dnL, variant of the soft drink 7 Up
 DNL or Deutsche Nachwuchsliga (the German Development League), is the elite junior league of the German Ice Hockey Federation
 Daniel Field, an airport in August (Georgia), according to IATA
 Day-Night Average Sound Level, a measure of average noise level over a day
 Denial eSports, a North American eSports organization.
 Det Norske Luftfartrederi, a Norwegian airline from 1918 to 1920.
 Det Norske Luftfartsselskap, one of the four Scandinavian airlines merged to produce Scandinavian Airlines System (SAS)
 Differential nonlinearity error, in electronics and digital signal processing
 North Dakota Democratic-NPL Party
 Dynamic Noise Limiter, a noise reduction system by Philips
 Discard to next line, a comment delimiter in the m4 computer language
 Do not load, a term sometimes used in Printed circuit board design to denote the omitting of a component